The 1995–96 Duke Blue Devils men's basketball team represented Duke University in the 1995-96 NCAA Division I men's basketball season. The head coach was Mike Krzyzewski and the team finished the season with an overall record of 18-13.

Roster

Team Poster

The 1995–96 Duke Blue Devils men's basketball team poster titled "Networking" features players assembled in Cameron Indoor Stadium dressed in business attire and surrounded by various productivity devices such as laptops, personal computers, telephones, and cellular phones.

Schedule

|-
!colspan=9 style=| ACC Tournament

|-
!colspan=9 style=| NCAA Tournament

Rankings

References 

Duke Blue Devils men's basketball seasons
Duke
1995 in sports in North Carolina
1996 in sports in North Carolina
Duke